Khirbet Abu Falah (translates to "Ruins of the Farmer's Father") is a Palestinian village in the Ramallah and al-Bireh Governorate, located  north of Ramallah in the central West Bank. According to the Palestinian Central Bureau of Statistics (PCBS), the village had a population of 4,237 in the 2007 census.

Geography
Khirbet Abu Falah is situated in a hilly area in the central highlands of the West Bank and has an average elevation of 743 meters above sea level. It is located 15.7 kilometers northeast of Ramallah. The nearest localities are al-Mazraa al-Sharqiyah  to the southwest, Turmus Ayya to the north, al-Mughayyir  to the east and Kafr Malik  to the south.

History
Potsherds from the Iron Age and Byzantine eras have been found here.

In 1970, Prawer and Benvenisti identified Khirbet Abu-Falah with the Crusader place called Caphrapalos, however, this identification was rejected by Israel Finkelstein.

Ottoman era
Potsherd from the early Ottoman era was found, but Finkelstein finds the identification "questionable."

The modern village was re–founded in the 18th century. Prior to becoming a permanent settlement, it was khirba i.e. a temporary settlement. Khirbet Abu Falah became a permanent village when the Jaradat and Shu'man clans moved there from al-Mazraa al-Sharqiya as a result of a dispute with other clans in that village. The village was named after one of its leaders, Abu Falah.

In 1838 Abu Felah was noted as a Muslim village, part of the Beni Salim district, located east of Jerusalem.

An Ottoman village list from about 1870 showed the village, called Chirbet abu-fellah, had a population of 265, with a total of 58 houses, though the population count only included men. It also noted it was located SE of Turmus Ayya.

In 1882, the PEF's Survey of Western Palestine (SWP) described it as: "a small hamlet on high ground, with ruins." They further noted, that it:  "appears to be an ancient site; cisterns and an ancient birkeh, partly of good-sized masonry and partly cut in rock, exist here, with foundations. The place is still inhabited."

In 1896 the population of Chirbet abu felah was estimated to be about 816 people.

British Mandate era
In the 1922 census of Palestine conducted by the British Mandate authorities, the village had a population of 519, all Muslims, increasing slightly in the 1931 census where Khirbet Abu Falah had a population of 588, in 125 houses.

In the 1945 statistics the population was 710, all Muslims, while the total land area was 8,186 dunams, according to an official land and population survey. Of this, 3,080 were allocated  for plantations and irrigable land, 1,615  for cereals, while 19 dunams were classified as built-up (urban) areas.

Jordanian era
In the wake of the 1948 Arab–Israeli War, and after the 1949 Armistice Agreements, Khirbet Abu Falah came under Jordanian rule.

The Jordanian census of 1961 found 1,057 inhabitants.

1967-present
Since the Six-Day War in 1967, Khirbet Abu Falah has been under Israeli occupation.

After the 1995 accords, 99.7% of village land was classified as Area B, the remaining 0.3% as Area C.

In 1998, a village council was established to administer Khirbet Abu Falah's civil affair. The council has nine members appointed by the Palestinian National Authority. The council is also included in the Joint Services Council, which is a cooperative board that also includes the villages of al-Mazraa al-Sharqiya, Kafr Malik and al-Mughayyir.

Demographics
Khirbet Abu Falah had a population of 2,900 in the 1997 census by the Palestinian Central Bureau of Statistics (PCBS). Palestinian refugees and their descendants accounted for 1.4% of the inhabitants. In the 2007 PCBS census, Khirbet Abu Falah's population grew to 3,966. The number of households was 620, with each household containing an average of between six and seven members. Women made up 49% of the population and men 51%.

The population is Muslim and there are three mosques in the village: the Old Mosque, the Eastern Mosque, and the Abu Ubeidah Mosque. The principal clans of Khirbet Abu Falah are Abu Murrah, Abu Falah, Al Fuqaha', Nazel, As Saraseer and Abu Hayyah. Since 2000, five families have emigrated from the village.

Economy
The largest source of employment in Khirbet Abu Falah is the services sector, which accounts for about 50% of the village's labor force. Other major sectors are government or professional employment (20%), agriculture (17%) and trade (10%). Industry, which accounts for 3% of Khirbet Abu Falah's labor, largely revolves around the local stone masonry industry. There are three quarries, 30 grocery stores, two produce stores, three butcheries and three professional workshops in the village. In 2011, the unemployment rate in Khirbet Abu Falah was 20%.

The village has a total area of 8,245 dunams. Built-up areas make up 8.4% of the village's land, while cultivable areas and open spaces constitute 56.4% and 35.1%, respectively. Of the cultivable areas, 3,981 dunams are planted with permanent crops, mainly olive trees and grains. About 5% of Khirbet Abu Falah's residents raise livestock and together own 835 sheep and 549 goats.

References

Bibliography

External links
Welcome To Khirbat Abu Falah
Survey of Western Palestine, Map 14:     IAA, Wikimedia commons
Khirbet Abu Falah Village (Fact Sheet),  Applied Research Institute–Jerusalem (ARIJ)
Khirbet Abu Falah Village Profile, ARIJ
Khirbet Abu Falah, aerial photo, ARIJ
 Settlers reportedly set blaze to West Bank home in possible hate crime

Villages in the West Bank
Ramallah and al-Bireh Governorate
Municipalities of the State of Palestine